Wetawit is an ethnic group in Ethiopia and Sudan.  They speak Berta, also known as Wetawit, a Nilo-Saharan language. The population of this group likely exceeds 100,000.

References
Joshua Project

Ethnic groups in Sudan